was a Japanese industrialist.  He was largely responsible for bringing Toyota Motor Corporation to profitability and worldwide prominence during his tenure as president and later, as chairman. He was succeeded as the president of Toyota by Shoichiro Toyoda.

Career
Toyoda studied mechanical engineering at Tokyo Imperial University from 1933 to 1936. During this time his cousin Kiichiro established an automobile plant at the Toyoda Automatic Loom Works in the city of Nagoya in central Japan. Toyoda joined his cousin in the plant at the conclusion of his degree and throughout their lives they shared a deep friendship. In 1938, Kiichiro asked Eiji to oversee construction of a newer factory about 32 km east of Nagoya on the site of a red pine forest in the town of Koromo, later renamed Toyota City. Known as the Honsha ("headquarters") plant, to this day it is considered the "mother factory" for Toyota Motor production facilities worldwide.

Toyoda visited Ford River Rouge Complex at Dearborn, Michigan, during the early 1950s. He was awed by the scale of the facility but dismissive of what he saw as its inefficiencies. Toyota Motor had been in the business of manufacturing cars for 13 years at this stage, and had produced just over 2,500 automobiles. The Ford plant in contrast manufactured 8,000 vehicles a day. Due to this experience, Toyoda decided to adopt American automobile mass production methods but with a qualitative twist.

Toyoda collaborated with Taiichi Ohno, a veteran loom machinist, to develop core concepts of what later became known as the 'Toyota Way', such as the Kanban system of labeling parts used on assembly lines, which was an early precursor to bar codes. They also fine-tuned the concept of Kaizen, a process of incremental but constant improvements designed to cut production and labor costs while boosting overall quality.

As a managing director of Toyota Motor, Toyoda failed in his first attempt to crack the U.S. market with the underpowered Toyota Crown sedan in the 1950s, but he succeeded with the Toyota Corolla compact in 1968, a year after taking over as president of the company. During the car's development phase, Toyoda, as executive vice-president, had to overcome the objections of then-president Fukio Nakagawa to install a newly developed 1.0-liter engine, air conditioning and automatic transmissions in the Corolla.

Appointed the fifth president of Toyota Motor, Toyoda went on to become the company's longest serving chief executive thus far. In 1981, he stepped down as president and assumed the title of chairman. He was succeeded as president by Shoichiro Toyoda. In 1983, as chairman, Eiji decided to compete in the luxury car market, which culminated in the 1989 introduction of Lexus. Toyoda stepped down as chairman of Toyota in 1994 at the age of 81.

Later years and death
In his later years, Toyoda was hospitalised for hip problems, and needed to use a wheelchair for a time, yet remained affable and enjoyed tackling sudoku puzzles. He spent most of his last years undergoing treatment at the Toyota Memorial Hospital in Toyota City, Japan, close to company headquarters.

Five days after his 100th birthday, Toyoda died of heart failure in the Toyota Memorial Hospital on 17 September 2013. Paying tribute to Toyoda, David Cole, former chairman of the Center for Automotive Research, said "He was a real visionary and inspirational leader who understood what it would take to make Toyota a successful company." Leslie Kendall, curator of the Petersen Automotive Museum, described Toyoda as the Japanese equivalent of Henry Ford.

Honours

Japanese
 April 1971 – Medal of Honor with Blue Ribbon
 November 1983 – Grand Cordon of the Order of the Sacred Treasure
 November 1990 – Grand Cordon of the Order of the Rising Sun

Non-Japanese
 March 1985 – Commander of the Order of Prince Henry of Portugal (ComIH)
 December 1990 – Knight Commander of the Order of the White Elephant of Thailand
 April 1991 – Grand Officer of the Order of the Crown of Belgium
 April 1992 – Knight Grand Cross of the Order of the Crown of Thailand
 September 1993 – Honorary Companion of the Order of Australia (AC)
 1994 – Automotive Hall of Fame, USA
 May 2001 – Knight Grand Cross of the Order of the Direkgunabhorn of Thailand

Family tree
Born into a family of textile manufacturers, Eiji Toyoda is the son of Heikichi Toyoda, the brother of Toyoda Loom Works founder Sakichi Toyoda. The descendants of Sakichi Toyoda have long dominated the upper management of Toyota Motors, which was incorporated in 1937. Eiji Toyoda died in September 2013. With his wife, Kazuko Toyoda (died 2002), he had three sons (Kanshiro, Tetsuro and Shuhei) and many grandchildren.

See also 
 Kiichiro Toyoda
 Sakichi Toyoda
 Shoichiro Toyoda
 Taiichi Ohno

Footnotes

External links 
 

1913 births
2013 deaths
People from Aichi Prefecture
Japanese chief executives
Chief executives in the automobile industry
Toyota people
Eiji
Japanese Buddhists
Japanese automotive pioneers
Japanese centenarians
Men centenarians
Grand Cordons of the Order of the Rising Sun
Recipients of the Order of the Sacred Treasure, 1st class
Eiji Toyoda
Commanders of the Order of Prince Henry
Grand Officers of the Order of the Crown (Belgium)
Honorary Companions of the Order of Australia
University of Tokyo alumni
Honorary Fellows of the London School of Economics
Japanese industrial engineers
Japanese industrialists
Presidents of the Japan Automobile Manufacturers Association